The Uganda Railway was a metre-gauge railway system and former British state-owned railway company. The line linked the interiors of Uganda and Kenya with the Indian Ocean port of Mombasa in Kenya. After a series of mergers and splits, the line is now in the hands of the Kenya Railways Corporation and the Uganda Railways Corporation.

Construction

Background
Before the railway's construction, the Imperial British East Africa Company had begun the Mackinnon-Sclater road, a  ox-cart track from Mombasa to Busia in Kenya, in 1890.

In July 1890, Britain was party to a series of anti-slavery measures agreed at the Brussels Conference Act of 1890. In December 1890, a letter from the Foreign Office to the treasury proposed constructing a railway from Mombasa to Uganda to disrupt the traffic of slaves from its source in the interior to the coast.

With steam-powered access to Uganda, the British could transport people and soldiers to ensure dominance of the African Great Lakes region.

In December 1891 Captain James Macdonald began an extensive survey which lasted until November 1892. The survey led to the first general map of the region.

The Uganda Railway was named after its ultimate destination, for its entire original  length actually lay in what would become Kenya. Construction began at the port city of Mombasa in British East Africa in 1896 and finished at the line's terminus, Kisumu, on the eastern shore of Lake Victoria, in 1901.

Engineering
The railway is  gauge and virtually all single-track with passing loops at stations. 200,000 individual  rail-lengths and 1.2 million sleepers, 200,000 fish-plates, 400,000 fish-bolts and 4.8 million steel keys plus steel girders for viaducts and causeways had to be imported from India, necessitating the creation of a modern port at Kilindini Harbour in Mombasa. The railway was a huge logistical achievement and became strategically and economically vital for both Uganda and Kenya. It helped to suppress slavery, by removing the need for humans in the transport of goods.

Management
In August 1895, a bill was introduced at Westminster, becoming the Uganda Railway Act 1896 which authorised the construction of a railway from Mombasa to the shores of Lake Victoria. The man tasked with building the railway was George Whitehouse, an experienced civil engineer who had worked across the British Empire. Whitehouse acted as the Chief Engineer between 1895 and 1903, also serving as the railway's manager from its opening in 1901. The consulting engineers were Sir Alexander Rendel of Sir. A Rendel & Son and Frederick Ewart Robertson.

Workers
Nearly all the workers involved on the construction of the line came from British India. An agent was appointed in Karachi responsible for recruiting coolies, artisans and subordinate officers and a branch office was located in Lahore, the principal recruiting centre. Workers were sourced from villages in the Punjab and sent to Karachi on specially chartered steamers belonging to the British India Steam Navigation Company. Shortly after recruitment began, a plague broke out in India, seriously delaying the advancement of the railway. The Government of India only permitted recruitment and emigration to resume on the creation of a quarantine camp at Budapore, financed by the Uganda Railway, and where recruits were required to spend fourteen days in quarantine before departure.

A total of 35,729 coolies and artisans were recruited along with 1,082 subordinate officers, totalling 36,811 persons. Each coolie signed a contract for three years at twelve rupees per month with free rations and return passage to their place of enlistment. They received half-pay when in hospital and free medical attendance. Recruitment continued between December 1895 and March 1901, and the first coolies began to return to India after their contracts ended in 1899. 2,493 workers died during the construction of the railway between 1895 and 1903 at a rate of 357 annually. While most of the surviving Indians returned home, 6,724 decided to remain after the line's completion, creating a community of Indians in East Africa.

Law and order
To maintain law and order, the railway instituted a police department. The force was uniformed and drilled and armed with Martini-Henry rifles. The force was composed of Indians and two officers were lent by the Indian government to drill and superintend the force. A maximum of 400 constables were recruited, and the force was handed over to the Protectorate government on completion of the railway.

Resistance 
At the turn of the 20th century, the railway construction was disturbed by the resistance by Nandi people led by Koitalel Arap Samoei. He was killed in 1905 by Richard Meinertzhagen, ending the Nandi resistance.

Tsavo man-eating lions

The incidents for which the building of the railway may be most noted are the killings of a number of construction workers in 1898, during the building of a bridge across the Tsavo River. Hunting mainly at night, a pair of maneless male lions stalked and killed at least 28 Indian and African workers – although some accounts put the number of victims as high as 135.

Lunatic Express

The Uganda Railway faced a great deal of criticism in Parliament, with many parliamentarians decrying it as exorbitantly expensive.  Whilst the concept of cost-benefit analysis did not exist in public spending in the Victorian Era, the huge capital sums of the project nevertheless made many sceptical of the value of the investment.  This, coupled with the fatalities and wastage of the personnel constructing it through disease, tribal activity, and hostile wildlife led the Uganda Railway to be dubbed a Lunatic Line:

Political resistance to this "gigantic folly", as Henry Labouchère called it, surfaced immediately. Such arguments along with the claim that it would be a waste of taxpayers' money were easily dismissed by the Conservatives. Years before, Joseph Chamberlain had proclaimed that, if Britain were to step away from its "manifest destiny", it would by default leave it to other nations to take up the work that it would have been seen as "too weak, too poor, and too cowardly" to have done itself. Its cost has been estimated by one source at £3 million in 1894 money, which is more than £170 million in 2005 money, and £5.5 million or £650 million in 2016 money by another source.

Because of the wooden trestle bridges, enormous chasms, prohibitive cost, hostile tribes, men infected by the hundreds by diseases, and man-eating lions pulling railway workers out of carriages at night, the name "Lunatic Line" certainly seemed to fit. Winston Churchill, who regarded it "a brilliant conception", said of the project: "The British art of 'muddling through' is here seen in one of its finest expositions. Through everything—through the forests, through the ravines, through troops of marauding lions, through famine, through war, through five years of excoriating Parliamentary debate, muddled and marched the railway."

The modern term Lunatic Express was coined by Charles Miller in his 1971 The Lunatic Express: An Entertainment in Imperialism.  The term The Iron Snake comes from an old Nandi prophecy by Orkoiyot Kimnyolei: "An iron snake will cross from the lake of salt to the lands of the Great Lake to quench it's thirst.."

Extensions and branches 
Disassembled ferries were shipped from Scotland by sea to Mombasa and then by rail to Kisumu where they were reassembled and provided a service to Port Bell and, later, other ports on Lake Victoria (see section below).

Branch lines were built to Thika in 1913, Lake Magadi in 1915, Kitale in 1926, Naro Moro in 1927 and from Tororo to Soroti in 1929. In 1929 the Uganda Railway became Kenya and Uganda Railways and Harbours (KURH), which in 1931 completed a branch line to Mount Kenya and extended the main line from Nakuru to Kampala in Uganda. In 1948 KURH became part of the East African Railways Corporation, which added the line from Kampala to Kasese in western Uganda in 1956. and extended to it to Arua near the  border with Zaïre in 1964.

Inland shipping

Lake Victoria

Almost from its inception the Uganda Railway developed shipping services on Lake Victoria. In 1898 it launched the 110 ton  at Kisumu, having assembled the vessel from a "knock down" kit supplied by Bow, McLachlan and Company of Paisley in Scotland. A succession of further Bow, McLachlan & Co. "knock down" kits followed. The 812 ton SS Nyanza (launched after Clement Hill) was purely a cargo ship. The 228 ton  launched in 1913 was a tugboat.

Lake Kyoga, Lake Albert and the Nile
The company extended its steamer service with a route across Lake Kyoga and down the Victoria Nile to Pakwach at the head of the Albert Nile. In the 1920s the company added  (1925) and the side wheel paddle steamer  (1927).

Safari tourism 

As the only modern means of transport from the East African coast to the higher plateaus of the interior, a ride on the Uganda Railway became an essential overture to the safari adventures which grew in popularity in the first two decades of the 20th century. As a result, it usually featured prominently in the accounts written by travelers in British East Africa. The rail journey stirred many a romantic passage, like this one from former U.S. President Theodore Roosevelt, who rode the line to start his world-famous safari in 1909: 

Passengers were invited to ride a platform on the front of the locomotive from which they might see the passing game herds more closely.  During Roosevelt's journey, he claimed that "on this, except at mealtime, I spent most of the hours of daylight."

Current status 

After independence, the railways in Kenya and Uganda fell into disrepair. In summer 2016, a reporter for The Economist magazine took the Lunatic Express from Nairobi to Mombasa.  He found the railway to be in poor conditions, departing 7 hours late and taking 24 hours for the journey.  The last metre-gauge train between Mombasa and Nairobi made its run on 28 April 2017.  The line between Nairobi and Kisumu near the Kenya–Uganda border has been closed since 2012.

From 2014 to 2016, the China Road and Bridge Corporation built the Mombasa–Nairobi Standard Gauge Railway (SGR) parallel to the original Uganda Railway.  Passenger service on the SGR was inaugurated on 31 May 2017.  The metre-gauge railway is still used to transport passengers between the new SGR Nairobi Terminus and the old metre-gauge train station in Nairobi city centre.

Research has shown that expectations and hopes for the transformations that the Uganda railway would bring about are similar to contemporary visions about the changes that would happen once East Africa became connected to high-speed fibre-optic broadband.

In popular culture

The  man-eating lions at Tsavo feature in a factual account by Patterson's 1907 autobiographical book The Man-eaters of Tsavo. John Halkin's 1968 novel, Kenya,  focuses on the construction of the railway and its defence during the First World War.

The construction of the railway serves as the backdrop to the novel Dance of the Jakaranda (Akashic Books, 2017) by Peter Kimani.

Several films have featured the Uganda Railway, including Bwana Devil, made in 1952,  the Tsavo man-eaters are part of the plot of the 1956 film Beyond Mombasa,  The Ghost and the Darkness, in 1996 and Chander Pahar, a 2013 Bengali movie based on the 1937 novel by Bibhutibhushan Bandyopadhyay.  In addition the 1985 film Out of Africa  shows the railway in a number of its scenes. A documentary on the construction of the line,  The Permanent Way was made in 1961.

See also

Kenya Railways Corporation
MacKinnon-Sclater road
Rail transport in Kenya
Transport in Uganda
Uganda Railways Corporation

References

Footnotes

Bibliography

External links

History of the Uganda Railway
 scale replica of EAR 31 class steam locomotive "Uganda" at Stapleford Miniature railway in the UK
  illustrated description of the Uganda railway

 
Rail transport in Uganda
Rail transport in Kenya
U
History of Kenya
History of Uganda
Uganda Protectorate
British Kenya
Metre gauge railways in Uganda
Metre gauge railways in Kenya
1896 establishments in Kenya
Railway companies established in 1896